The King's Head is a Grade II listed public house at 4 Fulham High Street, Fulham, London.

It was built in 1906 in the Scottish Baronial style.

The Post Office Directory listed it as owned by Criswick & Feaviour in 1919 and Feaviour & Co Ltd in 1938. The original address was 12 Fulham High St, but this was renumbered as No 4 by 1938.

Since March 2012 till 2013, it was trading as Low Country an American style "bar & eating house".  In recent years it has catered to a South African clientele as both Joe Cool's and Zulu's, and then traded as The Ramshackle. Previously, as The King's Head it was a popular live music venue.

The venue is now known as The Courtyard since August 2017 (previously The King's Head & Courtyard) - and was voted 'The Best Place To Drink In The Sun In London' in the 2018 Time Out Love London Awards. The bar followed on to win 6 other Time Out Awards and 1 Design My Night 2018 Award. The cocktail bar is known for changing over their garden every 6 months and their indoor cocktail lounge that changes into a popular night club environment in the evenings.

References

Pubs in the London Borough of Hammersmith and Fulham
Grade II listed pubs in London
Grade II listed buildings in the London Borough of Hammersmith and Fulham
Commercial buildings completed in 1906
Scottish baronial architecture
Fulham
1906 establishments in England